The First Ten Years is a 2012 compilation album by Italian band Gabin. The album documents the changing vocalists with each album. The compilation also reflects how the language of the songs also has changed with different album - but does not include the Portuguese songs from the previous album «Fim de noite» and «A vida e agora» sung by Flora Purim.

Track listing
 La Maison
 Une Histoire D’Amour (featuring Joseph Fargier)
 Doo Uap, Doo Uap, Doo Uap
 Azul Anil (vocals by French-Spanish singer Ana Carril Obiols of Mano Negra)
 Mr. Freedom (featuring Edwyn Collins)
 Into My Soul (vocals by Dee Dee Bridgewater)
 Bang Bang to the Rock’N'Roll
 The Other Way Round (vocals by Bridgewater's daughter China Moses)
 Keep It Cool (featuring Mia Cooper (singer))
 The Alchemist (featuring Mia Cooper)
 Lies (featuring Chris Cornell)
 The Game (featuring Mia Cooper)
 Lost and Found (featuring Mia Cooper)
 Ready, Set, Go! (featuring Mia Cooper)

References

2012 compilation albums